The Puppet Party is a political protest party in Denmark. The party was formed in April 2014. It declared its mission as “to exhibit the emptiness and thereby restarting democracy.” The party members have taken part in protests in rubber masks, interrupting  Parliament sessions.

References

External links
 Website

Political parties in Denmark
2014 establishments in Denmark
Political parties established in 2014